Messe solennelle is a setting of the Catholic Solemn Mass by the French composer Hector Berlioz. It was written in 1824, when the composer was twenty and first performed at the Church of Saint-Roch in Paris on 10 July 1825, and again at the Church of Saint-Eustache in 1827. After this, Berlioz claimed to have destroyed the entire score, except for the "Resurrexit", but in 1991 a Belgian schoolteacher, Frans Moors, came across a copy of the work in an organ gallery in Antwerp and it has since been revived.

Elements of Berlioz's Requiem and Symphonie fantastique appear in the Messe solennelle in somewhat altered versions. Themes from the Messe solennelle occur in the first half of his opera Benvenuto Cellini.

Forces and structure
Scored for soprano, tenor, (prominent) bass, mixed chorus, and large orchestra, including

Piccolo (opt.), 2 flutes, 2 oboes, 2 clarinets (C) 2 bassoons,
4 horns, 4 trumpets, 3 trombones (ATB), serpent, buccin (or ophicleide),
timpani, cymbals Tamtam, Harps (opt.), and strings

Its movements are:

Kyrie
Gloria
Gratias
Quoniam
Credo
Incarnatus
Crucifixus
Resurrexit
Motet pour l'Offertoire
Sanctus
O salutaris hostia
Agnus Dei
Domine salvum fac

Background

Berlioz was still composing his mass late in 1824, when he made arrangements to have it performed at the Church of Saint-Roch. He felt he needed a conductor for the large forces required. His teacher, Jean-François Le Sueur, was co-director of the Chapel Royale, where Henri Valentino, a violinist at the Chapel, but also one of the two chief conductors of the Paris Opera orchestra, had recently applied for the conducting post at the Chapel. Berlioz approached Valentino, who examined the score and agreed to conduct the performance, despite grave doubts concerning the forces at his disposal. The parts were being copied by choirboys from Saint-Roch when Berlioz celebrated his 21st birthday on 11 December. The concert was scheduled for 28 December, and the church sent invitations on behalf of the choirboys to newspapers, friends and likely patrons. The general rehearsal was scheduled for 27 December. Berlioz described it in his memoirs:

Berlioz had heard enough to make important revisions to the score, after which he copied out all the new parts himself. He also realized he needed to hire professional musicians, if his work was to be performed properly, but had little idea of how to finance such a performance. Nevertheless, Valentino remained supportive and agreed to conduct, when circumstances improved.

Berlioz's friend, Humbert Ferrand, suggested Berlioz ask for a loan from François-René de Chateaubriand, one of Berlioz's literary heroes, whose Génie du Christianisme later served as inspiration for the program of the Symphonie fantastique. Berlioz wrote a letter asking him for 1,200 francs (or possibly 1,500), or in lieu of that to put in a good word with the authorities, but he received only a prompt and courteous reply, which arrived on 1 January 1825:

In late January 1825 he tried without success to arrange a performance at the Church of Sainte-Geneviève (today the Panthéon), with Henri-Étienne Dérivis, a bass at the Paris Opera, to sing the solos.

Berlioz wrote home to his sister Nanci about the failed rehearsal, and his father, who staunchly opposed his son's pursuit of a career as a composer, learned of it and cut off his son's allowance on 24 February, beginning a period of financial hardship for Berlioz that lasted until the end of the 1820s.

The curé of Saint-Roch had selected 10 July, the feast of the Sacred Heart, for a performance of the Mass, and some musicians and singers from the Chapel Royale were recruited to form the core of the orchestra and chorus. They became unavailable when King Charles X decided to go to Saint-Cloud on the day of the premiere.

A month before the scheduled concert, he ran into his friend Augustin de Pons in the foyer of the Paris Opera house, the Salle Le Peletier. De Pons had been at the rehearsal in December and asked Berlioz about his Mass. When he learned of the situation he promised to arrange for funding to hire the Opéra chorus and a professional orchestra. The orchestra was formed from the Opera orchestra and the best of the players at the Théâtre-Italien. Berlioz even sought and received the endorsement of Raphaël Duplantys, the Opera's Director.

A few days before the premiere, Berlioz and his friend Ferrand visited the offices of some newspapers and journals, giving invitations to send a critic and to print announcements of the concert. Berlioz knew the staff at the Corsaire, and Ferrand, those at the Gazette de France, the Diable boiteux, and Le Globe.

Premiere and initial reception

The Messe solennelle was premiered on 10 July 1825 at the Church of Saint-Roch in Paris by an orchestra and chorus of 150, conducted by Henri Valentino. The bass soloist was Ferdinand Prévost. The work made a strong impression on a respectable audience. Many critics attended and wrote reviews, and Berlioz received kudos from many of the musicians.

Berlioz told his friend Albert Du Boys that the dramatic movements (the Kyrie, the Crucifixus, the Et iterum venturus, the Domine salvum, and the Sanctus) had the greatest impact:

Berlioz played the tam-tam in the Et iterum venturus and struck it so hard, that the whole church resounded. The critic of the Quotidienne wrote that in this movement, "M. Berlioz has given untrammeled scope to his imagination." Of the quieter movements,  the O salutaris was considered by the critic of the Corsaire to be music "of the noblest and most religious effect". Madame Lebrun of the chorus told Berlioz, "Damn, my boy: now there's an un-worm-eaten O Salutaris, and I defy those little bastards in the counterpoint classes at the Conservatoire to write a movement so tightly knit, so bloody religious."

His teacher, Jean-François Le Sueur, who attended with his wife and daughters, said:

Modern performances 
The first modern performance was conducted by John Eliot Gardiner at the church of St. Petri in Bremen on 3 October 1993. Other performances include three given at the 2012 Salzburg Festival, with the Vienna Philharmonic under Riccardo Muti.

Recordings
 Christa Pfeiler (soprano), Ruben Velasquez (tenor), Jacques Perroni (bass), National Kraków Choir and Philharmony, conducted by Jean-Paul Penin, live on October 5, 1993, at the Basilica of Sainte-Marie-Madeleine in Vézelay (France-Télévision, France-Musique, Accord Universal Music Group). First recording. 
 Donna Brown (soprano), Jean-Luc Viala (tenor), Gilles Cachemaille (bass-barytone), Orchestre Révolutionnaire et Romantique, conducted by John Eliot Gardiner, live, at Westminster Cathedral (Philips, 1994).
 Rosa Lamoreaux (soprano), Gene Tucker (tenor), Terry Cook (bass-baritone), Washington National Cathedral Choral Society & Orchestra, conducted by J. Reilly Lewis, live at National Cathedral (North American premiere) (Koch, 1994).
 Genia Kühmeier (soprano), Giuseppe Sabbatini (tenor), Ildar Abdrazakov (bass), Coro e Orchestra del Teatro alla Scala di Milano, conducted by Riccardo Muti, live in December 2004 (RAI-TV).
 Julia Kleiter (soprano), Saimir Pirgu (tenor), Ildar Abdrazakov (bass), Konzertvereinigung Wiener Staatsopernchor, Vienna Philharmonic Orchestra, conducted by Riccardo Muti, live in Salzburg in August 2012 (ORF).
 Adriana Gonzalez (soprano), Julien Behr (ténor), Andreas Wolf (bass), Le Concert Spirituel Chœur et Orchestre, conducted by Hervé Niquet, recorded in the Chapelle Royale of Château de Versailles in June 2019 (Alpha Classics)

References

Bibliography
 Cairns, David, editor and translator (1969). The memoirs of Hector Berlioz, 2002 edition. New York: Alfred A. Knopf. .
 Cairns, David (1999). Berlioz. Volume one. The Making of an Artist 1803-1832. Berkeley, California: University of California Press.  (hardcover).  (paperback).
 Holoman, D. Kern (1989). Berlioz. Cambridge, Massachusetts: Harvard University Press. .
 Hugh Macdonald: Berlioz ("The Master Musicians", J.M.Dent, 1982)
 Association Nationale Hector Berlioz, Bulletin de liaison, n°44, January 2010.

External links
 
 "Les Premières armes du jeune Berlioz : la Messe Solennelle", Jean-Paul Penin. 
 De ontdekking van de Messe Solennelle, W. Gladines.
 La Messe Solennelle de Berlioz, oct. 13 th, 1993 La Croix
 La Messe Solennelle de Berlioz, oct. 13 th, 1993 Le Monde

Compositions by Hector Berlioz
Berlioz
1824 compositions
Berlioz